Events in the year 1962 in Brazil.

Incumbents

Federal government
 President: João Goulart 
 Prime Minister: Tancredo Neves (until 12 July), Francisco de Paula Brochado da Rocha (from 12 July to 18 September), Hermes Lima (starting 18 September)
 Vice President: vacant

Governors 
 Alagoas: Luis Cavalcante 
 Amazonas: Gilberto Mestrinho
 Bahia:	Juracy Magalhães 
 Ceará: Parsifal Barroso 
 Espírito Santo:
 until 6 July: Raul Giuberti
 6 July-5 August: Hélsio Pinheiro Cordeiro
 from 5 August: Asdrúbal Martins Soares 
 Goiás: Mauro Borges 
 Guanabara: Carlos Lacerda
 Maranhão: Newton de Barros Belo 
 Mato Grosso: Fernando Corrêa da Costa 
 Minas Gerais: José de Magalhães Pinto  
 Pará: Aurélio do Carmo 
 Paraíba: Pedro Gondim 
 Paraná: Nei Braga 
 Pernambuco: Cid Sampaio 
 Piauí: Chagas Rodrigues (until 3 July); Tibério Nunes (from 3 July)
 Rio de Janeiro: Celso Peçanha (until 7 July); José Janotti (from 7 July)                                                                    
 Rio Grande do Norte: Aluízio Alves 
 Rio Grande do Sul: Leonel Brizola 
 Santa Catarina: Celso Ramos 
 São Paulo: Carlos Alberto Alves de Carvalho Pinto 
 Sergipe: Luís Garcia (until 6 July); Dionísio Machado (from 6 July)

Vice governors
 Alagoas: Teotônio Brandão Vilela 
 Bahia: Orlando Moscoso 
 Ceará: Wilson Gonçalves 
 Espírito Santo: Raul Giuberti (until 6 July); vacant thereafter (from 6 July)
 Goiás: Antônio Rezende Monteiro
 Maranhão: Alfredo Salim Duailibe 
 Mato Grosso: Jose Garcia Neto 
 Minas Gerais: Clóvis Salgado da Gama 
 Pará: Newton Burlamaqui de Miranda 
 Paraíba: André Avelino de Paiva Gadelha 
 Pernambuco: Pelópidas da Silveira 
 Piauí: Tibério Nunes (until 6 July); vacant thereafter (from 6 July)
 Rio de Janeiro: vacant
 Rio Grande do Norte: Walfredo Gurgel (until 31 January); vacant thereafter (from 31 January)
 Santa Catarina: Armindo Marcílio Doutel de Andrade
 São Paulo: Porfírio da Paz 
 Sergipe: Dionísio Machado (until 6 July); vacant thereafter (from 6 July)

Events

June 
 June 15 - The territory of Acre becomes the country's 22nd state. A star representing Acre would be added to the flag of Brazil six years later. 
 June 17 - Brazil defeats Czechoslovakia 3–1 to win the 1962 FIFA World Cup Final in Chile. Brazil wins its second FIFA World Cup.

Deaths

See also 
 1962 in Brazilian television

References

External links 

 
1960s in Brazil
Years of the 20th century in Brazil
Brazil
Brazil